Bob Drummond (15 April 1919 – 8 February 1991) was an Australian rules footballer who played with Essendon and North Melbourne in the Victorian Football League (VFL).

Notes

External links 

1919 births
1991 deaths
Australian rules footballers from Victoria (Australia)
Essendon Football Club players
North Melbourne Football Club players